= Hindu Satkar Samiti =

Hindu Satkar Samiti (Bengali: হিন্দু সৎকার সমিতি) is a Hindu charitable organization based in Kolkata that performs the cremation of unclaimed Hindu corpses. The Hindu Satkar Samiti is the only body authorized to carry the dead bodies of Hindus in the hearses and cremate them. It was founded in 1932.

== Facilities ==
In 2005, the Samiti bought a six-bed mortuary cooler that can preserve a corpse for two days, in order to cater the NRI people. However, the Samiti could not set up the mortuary in its Burrabazar premises, because of objections from the local people. Subsequently, the Samiti had requested the Kolkata Municipal Corporation to allot plot of land for setting up the mortuary.
